Charles Hanses ( – ) was a Member of Parliament for Winchester from 1685 to 1689.

Hanses was the eldest son of John Hanses of Selby and York, Yorkshire. He was educated at Archbishop Holgate's School in York. He matriculated at  Magdalene College, Cambridge, in 1677, aged 17, and attended St John's College, Cambridge. He entered Gray's Inn in 1681 and was called to the bar in 1683.

References

English MPs 1685–1687
1659 births
Year of birth uncertain
1697 deaths
Politicians from York
Alumni of Magdalene College, Cambridge
Alumni of St John's College, Cambridge
People educated at Archbishop Holgate's School